The Pharmacy Act 1852 was the first legislation in the United Kingdom to regulate pharmacists and druggists.

It set up a register of pharmacists and limited the use of the title to people registered with the Pharmaceutical Society, but proposals to give the society exclusive rights to sell drugs or poisons were rejected.  It did not provide a legal definition for the trade and practice of pharmacy.

Notes

United Kingdom Acts of Parliament 1852
Drug control law in the United Kingdom
Substance dependence
Pharmacy in the United Kingdom